Deshabandu Victor Hettigoda (1937 – 2 April 2022) was a Sri Lankan entrepreneur and a candidate for the 2005 Sri Lankan presidential election. He was considered as one of the most successful Sri Lankan entrepreneurs post-independence. He died on 2 April 2022, at the age of 84.

Early life 
Hettigoda, Chairman of Hettigoda Group of Companies, was born at Kananke, Matara in 1937 to a family of resounding standing, reputation and admiration. Victor was the fifth of a family of nine children. He received his education at Rahula College, Matara. On leaving school, he joined his father as a 'helper student' in pursuit of the ancestral noble profession of Ayurveda Medicine. It took him nearly 12 years to learn the art of Ayurveda Medicine. He spent many late nights burning the mid-night oil, engrossed in the "Ola Leaf" Manuscripts and books on Ayurveda.

Victor was married to a school teacher and has two daughters and a son. The children are also involved in his businesses.

Manufacturing of Ayurvedic products
Victor's untiring efforts and devotion towards Ayurveda won the accolade of his father resulting in the reward of disclosing the secret Formula of "Siddhalepa" Balm – the Wonder Balm. The desire for independence and the anxiety for achievement were in him, but financial resources were a problem to him. However, the initial investment of Rs 2,500/= came to him from a trusted relative in 1971 to start his venture.

The man worked hard travelling – very often on foot- across the length and breadth of the country selling his balm, soap and mosquito coils. Today it is a flourishing multi – crore enterprise exporting to 19 countries and employing 3,500 employees.

Moreover, Hettigoda was also one of the main founders of the wonder balm, Siddhalepa. The secret formula, which has been guarded for more than 200 years was disclosed to him by his father, and after working hard to promote the product, is now recognized worldwide as a leader in "Veda Beheth" (Sinhala for herbal based medicine).

Besides the Ayurvedic products he has also established ayurvedic hospitals cum health resort – hotels. There is the modern hospital in Anuradhapura and compost factory collecting elephant dung in Talawa.

Presidential election 2005
Hettigoda, one of 13 candidates in a packed field that included then Prime Minister Mahinda Rajapakse and then former Prime Minister and current Prime Minister Ranil Wickremesinghe, told Sri Lankan newspaper The Island that if elected, he would use his vast fortune to buy a cow for every home in the country.  He said that the cows would be used to fight off malnutrition, suggesting that any excess milk, cheese or butter could be exported.

References

External links
 Official Website of Hettigoda Group (Siddhalepa)

1937 births
2022 deaths
Candidates in the 2005 Sri Lankan presidential election
Alumni of Rahula College
Sinhalese businesspeople
Deshabandu
People from Matara, Sri Lanka